Puppy Luv is a simulation video game for the Wii and Microsoft Windows released on October 25, 2007. The Wii version was developed by Game Mill and published by Activision. It was developed and published for Microsoft Windows by a Canadian studio Gogii Games.

Gameplay
Puppy Luv is a sim game designed for one player and revolving around caring for a puppy.

It contains:
Six breeds: Dalmatian, Beagle, Golden Retriever, Labrador Retriever, German Shepherd, German Short-haired Pointer; unlockable: Boxer, Miniature Schnauzer
Ten tricks
Six competitions

The player chooses a puppy and then cares for it by feeding, grooming, and training it, which also earns the player money to buy things. The player is able to take their puppy for walks to allow it to relieve itself.

The player learns tricks to earn money in competitions.

Reception
Lucas M. Thomas of IGN gave the Wii version of Puppy Luv a score of 3.5/10. He criticized the game for its lack of features in comparison to Nintendogs, its "frustrating" implementation of the Wii Remote controls, and the presentation of the game being over-reliant on cutscenes and canned animations.

References

External links
Puppy Luv at Gogii Games.

2006 video games
2007 video games
Activision games
Video games developed in Canada
Video games about dogs
Virtual pet video games
Wii games
Windows games